Paul Weller is a musician.

Paul Weller may also refer to:

Paul Weller (politician) (born 1959), Australian politician
Paul Weller (footballer) (born 1975), English former footballer
Paul Weller (album), 1992

See also

Weller, Paul